The 1916 United States presidential election in Georgia took place on November 7, 1916, as part of the wider United States presidential election. Voters chose 14 representatives, or electors, to the Electoral College, who voted for president and vice president.

Background
With the exception of a handful of historically Unionist North Georgia counties – chiefly Fannin but also to a lesser extent Pickens, Gilmer and Towns – Georgia since the 1880s had been a one-party state dominated by the Democratic Party. Disfranchisement of almost all African-Americans and most poor whites had made the Republican Party virtually nonexistent outside of local governments in those few hill counties, and the national Democratic Party served as the guardian of white supremacy against a Republican Party historically associated with memories of Reconstruction. The only competitive elections were Democratic primaries, which state laws restricted to whites on the grounds of the Democratic Party being legally a private club.

Vote
The Wilson/Marshall ticket easily carried the state of Georgia on election day.

Results

Results by county

Notes

References

1916 Georgia (U.S. state) elections
Georgia
1916